Liga 1 (English: League One) is the men's top professional football division of the Indonesian football league system from the 2008–09 season onwards. Liga 1 was formerly known as Indonesia Super League.

In bold: players that played at least one Liga 1 game in the current season (2022–23), and the clubs they have played for.

Naturalised players
  Alberto Gonçalves – Persijap, Persipura, Arema Cronus, Sriwijaya, Madura United, Persija, – 2008–2010, 2010–2014, 2016–
  Bio Paulin – Persipura Jayapura, Sriwijaya – 2008–2018
  Bruno Casimir – Persita Tangerang, Arema Indonesia – 2008–2009, 2013
  Cristian Gonzáles – Persib Bandung, Putra Samarinda, Arema Cronus, Madura United – 2008–2018
  Diego Michiels – Pelita Jaya, Arema Indonesia, Sriwijaya, Mitra Kukar, Borneo, Arema – 2011–
  Donald Bissa – PSM Makassar – 2022–
  Esteban Vizcarra – Pelita Jaya/Madura United, Semen Padang, Arema, Sriwijaya, Persib Bandung – 2009–
  Ezra Walian – PSM Makassar, Persib Bandung – 2019–
  Fabiano Beltrame – Persela Lamongan, Persija Jakarta, Arema, Madura United, Persib Bandung, PSS Sleman, Persis Solo – 2008–
  Fassawa Camara – PSM Makassar – 2014
  Godstime Ouseluka Egwuatu – Persipura Jayapura – 2019
  Greg Nwokolo – Persija Jakarta, Pelita Jaya, Arema Cronus, Persebaya ISL, Madura United – 2008–2009, 2010–2015, 2016–22
  Guy Junior – Persiwa Wamena, Madura United, Bhayangkara, PSM Makassar, Borneo, Barito Putera – 2013, 2016–21
  Herman Dzumafo – PSPS, Arema Indonesia, Persib, Sriwijaya, Mitra Kukar, Gresik United, Borneo, Persela, Bhayangkara – 2009–2016, 2018–2021, 2022
  Ilija Spasojević – Mitra Kukar, Putra Samarinda, Persib Bandung, Bhayangkara, Bali United – 2013–2016, 2017–
  Jhon van Beukering – Pelita Jaya – 2011–2012
  Kim Kurniawan – Persema Malang, Pelita Bandung Raya, Persib Bandung, PSS Sleman – 2011–
  Lee Yu-jun – Bhayangkara, Madura United – 2016–
  Mamadou Diallo – PSM Makassar, Persela Lamongan – 2014–2015
  Marc Klok – PSM Makassar, Persija Jakarta, Persib Bandung – 2017–
  Mohammadou Al Hadji – Semen Padang, Barito Putera, Borneo, Sriwijaya – 2015–2019
  O.K. John – Persiwa, Persik, Persebaya ISL, Mitra Kukar, Persija, Madura United, Persebaya, Kalteng Putra, Barito Putera, RANS Nusantara – 2008–14, 2015–16, 2018–20, 2021–
  Osas Saha – PSMS, Persepam MU, Persisam Putra, Persiram, Semen Padang, Perseru, Persija, TIRA-Persikabo, PSM, Bhayangkara, Persita – 2011–2021, 2022
  Otávio Dutra – Persipura Jayapura, Gresik United, Bhayangkara, Persebaya Surabaya, Persija Jakarta – 2012–
  Raphael Maitimo – Mitra Kukar, Sriwijaya, Persija, Persib, Madura United, Persebaya, PSM, Persita, Barito Putera – 2013–2018, 2018–22
  Ruben Wuarbanaran – Pelita Jaya, Barito Putera – 2011–15
  Sackie Teah Doe – Barito Putera, Persik Kediri – 2019–2021
  Sergio van Dijk – Persib Bandung – 2013–2014, 2016–2017
  Sílvio Escobar – Persepam MU, PSM, Bali United, Perseru, Persija, PSIS, Persikabo 1973, Persiraja, Madura United – 2014–22
  Stefano Lilipaly – Bali United – 2017–
  Tonnie Cusell – Barito Putera – 2014
  Victor Igbonefo – Persipura Jayapura, Pelita Jaya, Arema Cronus, Persib Bandung – 2008–
  Yoo Hyun-goo – Semen Padang, Sriwijaya, Kalteng Putra, Barito Putera – 2010–2020, 2022
  Zoubairou Garba – Sriwijaya, TIRA-Persikabo, Persebaya Surabaya – 2008–2009, 2019–2020

Afghanistan 
 Adam Najem – Bhayangkara – 2022–
 Farshad Noor – Persib Bandung – 2020–2021
 Jabar Sharza – Persela Lamongan, Persiraja Banda Aceh – 2021–2022

Argentina 
 Adrian Trinidad – Persiba Balikpapan – 2009–2010
 Agustín Cattaneo – Persita Tangerang – 2022–23
 Alan Aciar – Persija Jakarta – 2015
 Alexis Messidoro – Persis Solo – 2022–
 Carlos Sciucatti – Persijap Jepara, Persela Lamongan, Persidafon Dafonsoro, Persijap Jepara, Mitra Kukar – 2008–2010, 2014–2015
 Claudio Pronetto – Deltras, PSM Makassar, Gresik United  – 2008–2010, 2011–2012
 Elías Alderete – Arema – 2020
 Esteban Herrera – Mitra Kukar – 2012–2013
 Ezequiel González – Semen Padang, Persiba Bantul – 2013–2014
 Ezequiel Vidal – Persita Tangerang – 2022–
 Facundo Talín – PS TNI – 2017
 Fernando Soler – Persiba Balikpapan, Borneo – 2013–2015
 Gaspar Vega – Persik Kediri – 2020
 Gaston Castaño – Persiba Balikpapan, PSMS Medan, Gresik United, Pelita Bandung Raya, Persela Lamongan – 2008–2015, 2018
 Gustavo Chena – Deltras, Gresik United – 2009–2010, 2011–2014
 Gustavo López – Persela Lamongan, Arema Cronus, PS TIRA – 2011–2014, 2018
 Jonathan Bauman – Persib Bandung, Arema – 2018–2019, 2020
 Jonathan Bustos – Borneo – 2021–
 José Sardón – Semen Padang – 2019
 Leonel Núñez – PS TNI – 2017
 Marcelo Cirelli - Persebaya Surabaya, Persidafon Dafonsoro, Persibo Bojonegoro, Persis Solo - 2009-2014
 Marcos Flores – Persib Bandung, Bali United – 2016–2017
 Mariano Berriex – PS TIRA – 2018
 Mario Barcia – Semen Padang – 2019
 Mario Costas – Persela Lamongan, Persija Jakarta, PSM Makassar – 2011–2014
 Mateo Bustos – Persita Tangerang – 2020
 Matías Conti – Borneo – 2018–2019
 Matías Córdoba – Barito Putera – 2017–2018
 Pablo Francés – Persijap Jepara, Persib Bandung – 2008–2011
 Paolo Frangipane – Mitra Kukar – 2012–2013
 Ramiro Fergonzi – Bhayangkara, Persipura Jayapura, Persita Tangerang – 2019, 2022–
 Robertino Pugliara – Persija Jakarta, Persiba Balikpapan, PSM Makassar, Persipura Jayapura, Persib Bandung, Persebaya Surabaya – 2008–2017, 2018

Australia 
 Aaron Evans – Barito Putera, PSM Makassar, PSS Sleman, Persis Solo – 2017–22
 Abu Bakar Sillah – Persepam MU – 2013–2014
 Ante Bakmaz – Madura United, Persik Kediri – 2019–2020
 Anthony Golec – Badak Lampung – 2019
 Aryn Williams – Persebaya Surabaya – 2019–2021
 Bruce Djite – PSM Makassar – 2018
 Cameron Watson – Madura United – 2017
 Christopher Gómez – Persepam MU – 2013–2014
 Dane Milovanović – Pelita Bandung Raya, Madura United – 2012–2013, 2016–2017, 2019
 Daniel Zeleny – Gresik United – 2012
 Diogo Ferreira – Persib Bandung – 2016–2017
 Edemar Garcia – Arema Indonesia – 2013
 Golgol Mebrahtu – PSM Makassar – 2022
 Gustavo Girón – Arema Cronus, Persegres Gresik United – 2016–2017
 Jacob Pepper – Madura United – 2020–2021
 Jamie Coyne – Sriwijaya – 2012–2013
 Kwabena Appiah – Madura United – 2023–
 Michael Baird – PSM Makassar – 2014
 Nick Kalmar – Arema Cronus – 2016
 Reinaldo Elias da Costa – PSM Makassar, Persija Jakarta – 2017
 Robert Gaspar – Persiba Balikpapan, Persema Malang, Persib Bandung – 2008–2010, 2011–2012
 Sean Rooney – Deltras – 2011–2012
 Srećko Mitrović – PSM Makassar, Deltras – 2010–2013
 Steve Hesketh – Deltras, Arema Indonesia – 2010–2012
 Troy Hearfield – Pelita Jaya – 2011

Bahrain 
 Abdulla Yusuf Helal – Persija Jakarta – 2022–

Belarus 
 Dzmitry Rekish – PS TIRA – 2018
 Sergey Pushnyakov – Persikabo 1973 – 2021–2022

Belgium 
 Yanis Mbombo – RANS Nusantara – 2023–

Bolivia 
 Damián Lizio – Persebaya Surabaya – 2019

Bosnia and Herzegovina 
 Eldar Hasanović – Persita Tangerang – 2020
 Muamer Svraka – Semen Padang 2016–2017
 Šerif Hasić – PSM Makassar – 2020-2021
 Želimir Terkeš – Persija Jakarta – 2014

Brazil 
 Addison Alves – Persela Lamongan, Persipura Jayapura, Persija Jakarta – 2014, 2017–2018
 Adilson Maringá – Arema – 2021–
 Alan Henrique – Sriwijaya – 2018
 Alex da Silva – PSM Makassar – 2016
 Alex Gonçalves – Persela Lamongan, TIRA-Persikabo, Persita Tangerang – 2019–2020, 2021
 Alex Martins – Bhayangkara – 2023–
 Amarildo Luis de Souza – Persijap Jepara, Persik Kediri – 2008–2010
 Anderson Nascimento – Persik Kediri – 2023–
 Anderson da Silva – Persebaya Surabaya, Mitra Kukar – 2008–09, 2010–12
 Anderson da Silva – Persiram Raja Ampat – 2011–12
 Anderson Salles – Bhayangkara – 2019, 2021–
 Anderson Tegao – PSMS Medan – 2008–2009
 André Ribeiro – Persipura Jayapura – 2019
 Andrezinho – Barito Putera – 2015
 Antônio Teles – PSIS Semarang, Persiba Balikpapan – 2008–2009, 2015–2016
 Arthur Cunha – Mitra Kukar, Arema, Persipura Jayapura 2015–2020
 Arthur Félix – Persik Kediri – 2021–23
 Artur Vieira – Barito Putera – 2019
 Beto de Paula – Madura United, Perseru Serui – 2018
 Bruno Cantanhede – Persib Bandung – 2022
 Bruno Dybal – Persiraja Banda Aceh – 2020, 2022
 Bruno Lopes – Persija Jakarta, Madura United – 2017, 2020, 2021
 Bruno Matos  – Persija Jakarta, Bhayangkara, Madura United, Barito Putera – 2019–2021, 2022
 Bruno Moreira – Persebaya Surabaya – 2021–2022
 Bruno Silva – PSIS Semarang – 2018, 2019–2022
 Bruno Smith – Arema – 2020–2021
 Bruno Zandonaide – Persiba Balikpapan, Persita Tangerang – 2008–2009
 Caio Ruan – Arema – 2020
 Carlos Eduardo Bizarro – Pelita Jaya – 2008–2010
 Cássio de Jesus – Semen Padang, Barito Putera – 2015–2016, 2019–2021
 Ciro Alves – Persikabo 1973, Persib Bandung – 2019–
 Claudir Marini – PSIS Semarang – 2019
 Cleberson – Madura United - 2022-
 Cristiano Lopes – Deltras – 2010–2011
 Danilo Fernando – Persik Kediri, Deltras, Persisam Putra Samarinda – 2008–2012
 David Bala – Kalteng Putra – 2019
 David da Silva – Persebaya Surabaya, Persib Bandung 2018, 2019–2020, 2021–
 Demerson Bruno – Bali United, Persela Lamongan – 2017–2019, 2021-2022
 Diano – Sriwijaya – 2010–2011
 Diego Assis – Persela Lamongan, Madura United, Bali United – 2018–2019, 2021
 Diego Santos – Sriwijaya, Persiba Balikpapan, Semen Padang – 2011–2013, 2016
 Diogo Campos – Kalteng Putra, Persebaya Surabaya, Borneo – 2019–2021
 Dionatan Machado – Persik Kediri – 2021-2022
 Douglas Packer – Barito Putera – 2017–2018
 Éber Bessa – Bali United – 2021–
 Edésio Sérgio Ribeiro de Oliveira – Deltras, Persijap Jepara – 2008–2009
 Edílson Tavares – Pusamania Borneo – 2016
 Eduardo Maciel – Gresik United – 2016
 Evaldo Silva – Persijap Jepara – 2008–2011, 2014
 Everton Nascimento – PSM Makassar – 2022–
 Eydison – Kalteng Putra – 2019
 Fabrício Bastos – PSMS Medan, Persita Tangerang – 2008–2009, 2013–2014
 Felipe Martins – PSMS Medan – 2018
 Fernandinho – Badak Lampung – 2019
 Flávio Beck – Borneo, Bhayangkara, Semen Padang, PSIS Semarang – 2016–2017, 2019-2021, 2022
 Francisco Torres – Badak Lampung, Barito Putera, Borneo – 2019–2020, 2021–2022
 Gabriel do Carmo – Persela Lamongan, Persiraja Banda Aceh – 2020–2021
 Giancarlo Rodrigues – PSM Makassar – 2020
 Guilherme Batata – PSS Sleman, Persela Lamongan – 2019–2022
 Gustavo Tocantins – Persikabo 1973, Barito Putera – 2022–
 Harrison Cardoso – Persita Tangerang – 2021–2022
 Hedipo Gustavo – Kalteng Putra, Bhayangkara, Persipura Jayapura – 2019, 2021–2022
 Helder Lobato – Borneo – 2016–2017
 Henrique Motta – Persipura Jayapura – 2021
 Higor Vidal – Persebaya Surabaya – 2022
 Hilton Moreira – Persib Bandung, Sriwijaya, Persipura Jayapura – 2008–2013, 2016–2018
 Hugo Gomes – Madura United – 2021–
 Ivan Carlos – Persela Lamongan, Persija Jakarta – 2016–2018, 2021
 Jaimerson Xavier – Persija Jakarta, Madura United, Persis Solo – 2017–
 Jefferson Oliveira – Persik Kediri – 2020
 Joanderson – Persik Kediri – 2022
 Júlio César – Borneo Samarinda – 2023–
 Jose Barbosa – PSS Sleman – 2021–2022
 Jose Wilkson – Persebaya Surabaya, Persela Lamongan – 2021–2022
 Júnior Lopes – Persiba Balikpapan – 2017
 Léo Lelis – Persiraja Banda Aceh, Persebaya Surabaya – 2021–
 Lexe – PSIS Semarang, Gresik United – 2008–2009, 2011
 Lucas Gama – Persikabo 1973 – 2022–
 Lucas Patinho – Bali United – 2016
 Lucas Ramos – Dewa United – 2022–
 Lucas Silva – Barito Putera – 2019
 Luiz Carlos Júnior – Barito Putera, Madura United, Persija Jakarta – 2016–2017
 Luiz Ricardo – PSM Makassar – 2016
 Lulinha – Madura United – 2022–
 Marcel Sacramento – Semen Padang, Persipura Jayapura, Barito Putera – 2016–2018
 Márcio Rosário – Persela Lamongan, Persipura Jayapura – 2017, 2018
 Márcio Souza – Deltras, Arema Indonesia, Persib Bandung – 2009–2012
 Márcio Teruel – Arema Cronus – 2016
 Marclei Santos – Mitra Kukar – 2017
 Marlon da Silva – Mitra Kukar, Persiba Balikpapan, Borneo – 2016–2018
 Marquinhos Carioca – Badak Lampung, Persela Lamongan – 2019–2021
 Matheus Lopes – Borneo – 2017
 Matheus Pato – Borneo Samarinda – 2022–
 Mauricio Leal – Sriwijaya, Persipura Jayapura, Mitra Kukar – 2016, 2017–2018
 Maxwell – Persiwa Wamena – 2013
 Maycon Calijuri – Persiba Balikpapan – 2016
 Mazinho – Perseru Serui – 2018
 Mychell Chagas – PSS Sleman – 2022
 Patrick da Silva – Persija Jakarta, Gresik United, Barito Putera – 2016–2018
 Patrick Mota – PSIS Semarang – 2019
 Paulo Eduardo – Persela Lamongan – 2016
 Paulo Henrique – Persiraja Banda Aceh – 2021–2022
 Paulo Victor – Persebaya Surabaya – 2023
 Rafael Alves Bastos – Persib Bandung – 2008–2009
 Rafael Bonfim – Kalteng Putra – 2019
 Rafael Silva – Barito Putera, Madura United – 2019, 2021–2023
 Rafinha – Persela Lamongan, Barito Putera – 2019–2020, 2021, 2022
 Ramon Rodrigues – Persela Lamongan – 2017
 Reinaldo Lobo – Mitra Kukar, PSMS Medan – 2014, 2018
 Renan Alves – Borneo, Barito Putera – 2018, 2022–
 Renan Silva – Persija Jakarta, Borneo, Bhayangkara, Madura United, Persik Kediri – 2018–
 Renan Sgaria Farias - Persikabo 1973 - 2022
 Ricardinho – Persipura Jayapura – 2016–2017
 Rodrigo Ost – Mitra Kukar, Arema – 2015–2016, 2018
 Rodrigo Tosi – Persija Jakarta – 2016
 Sílvio Rodrigues – Persebaya Surabaya, Persikabo 1973 – 2022–
 Tárik Boschetti – Pusamania Borneo – 2016
 Tallysson Duarte – PSS Sleman – 2022
 Taylon Correa – Persita Tangerang – 2022
 Thiago Amaral – Barito Putera, Persipura Jayapura – 2016, 2020–2021
 Thiago Cunha – Barito Putera – 2017
 Thiago Furtuoso – Bhayangkara, Madura United, Arema – 2015, 2016–2018
 Vagner Luís – PSM Makassar, Persiwa Wamena, PSMS Medan – 2008–10, 2011–12
 Vanderlei Francisco – Semen Padang, Persiraja Banda Aceh – 2019–2020
 Victor Sallinas – RANS Nusantara – 2022
 Vinicius Reis – Persiba Balikpapan – 2016
 Vitinho – PSIS Semarang – 2023-
 Wallace Costa – Persela Lamongan, PSIS Semarang – 2018–2022
 Wander Luiz – Persib Bandung, PSS Sleman – 2020–2022
 Wellington Carvalho – Bali United – 2023–
 Willian Correia – RANS Nusantara – 2023–
 Willian Lira – Barito Putera – 2017
 Willian Pacheco – Persija Jakarta, Bali United – 2016–17, 2019–22
 Xandão – Persija Jakarta – 2019
 Yann Motta – Persija Jakarta – 2021
 Zada – PSMS Medan, Persela Lamongan – 2008–2011

Bulgaria 
 Martin Kovachev – Pusamania Borneo – 2015
 Stanislav Zhekov – Pelita Jaya, Perseman Manokwari – 2011–2013

Burkina Faso 
 Habib Bamogo – Persiram Raja Ampat – 2014–2015

Cameroon 
 Herman Abanda – Persija Jakarta, Persema Malang, Persib Bandung, Barito Putera – 2008–2014
 Alain N'Kong – Arema Indonesia, Persepam MU – 2011–2012, 2013–2014
 Banaken Bassoken – Persitara Jakarta Utara, PSPS Pekanbaru – 2009–2011
 David Pagbe – Semen Padang, Persela Lamongan, Persib Bandung – 2010–2011, 2014–2016
 Rudolf Ebendje – Persitara Jakarta Utara – 2008–2009
 Émile Mbamba – Persiba Bantul, Bhayangkara – 2014–2015
 Emmanuel Kenmogne – Persija Jakarta, Persebaya ISL – 2013–2015, 2016
 Eric Bayemi - Persija Jakarta, Persidafon Dafonsoro - 2010-2014
 Franck Ongfiang – Sriwijaya – 2014
 Georges Nicolas Djone - Persita Tangerang, PPSM Sakti Magelang, Persis Solo - 2008-2011
 Henry Njobi Elad – PSM Makassar, Barito Putera, Perseru Serui – 2009–2010, 2013, 2016
 Jean-Paul Boumsong – Persiram Raja Ampat, Perseru Serui – 2012–2013, 2014–2016
 Joel Tsimi – Sriwijaya, Persisam Putra Samarinda, PSPS Pekanbaru – 2008–2013
 Louise Parfait – TIRA-Persikabo – 2019
 Luc Zoa – Persisam Putra Samarinda – 2011–2012
 Mbida Messi – Persib Bandung, Persiram Raja Ampat – 2012–2014
 Ngon A Djam – Sriwijaya, Persebaya Surabaya, Persema Malang, Persidafon Dafonsoro – 2008–2012
 Guy Mamoun – Gresik United, Persijap Jepara – 2013–2014
 Patrice Nzekou – PSPS Pekanbaru, Persiba Balikpapan – 2010–2014
 Pierre Njanka – Persija Jakarta, Arema Indonesia. Aceh United, Mitra Kukar, Persisam Putra Samarinda – 2008-2013
 Privat Mbarga – Bali United – 2022–
 Salomon Bengondo – PSIS Semarang – 2008
 Seme Pattrick – Persema Malang, Arema Indonesia, Persiram Raja Ampat, Perseru Serui – 2008–2014
 Serge Emaleu – Arema Malang, Persija Jakarta, Persela Lamongan – 2008–2009, 2010–2013
 Thierry Gathuessi – Sriwijaya, Arema Indonesia, Persiram Raja Ampat, Barito Putera – 2010–2016

Cape Verde 
 Yuran Fernandes – PSM Makassar – 2022–

Central African Republic 
 Franklin Anzité – PS TIRA – 2017

Chad 
 Karl Max Barthélémy – Semen Padang – 2019–2020
 Ezechiel N'Douassel – Persib Bandung, Bhayangkara – 2017–2022

Colombia 
 Jose Guerra – Persija Jakarta – 2016
 Juan Pablo Pino – Arema, Barito Putera – 2017–2018

Chile 
 Cristian Carrasco – PSM Makassar, Persita Tangerang – 2009–2013
 Cristian Febre – PSM Makassar, Bali United – 2013–2015
 Julio Lopez – PSM Makassar, Persiba Balikpapan, Persisam Putra Samarinda, Persijap Jepara – 2008–2012
 Leonardo Osses – PSIS Semarang – 2008–2009
 Luis Durán – Persita Tangerang – 2013–2014
 Luis Peña – PSM Makassar, Gresik United, PSMS Medan – 2009–2012
 Pato Morales – Arema Indonesia, Persik Kediri – 2008–2009, 2010–2011

Croatia 
 Goran Ljubojević – Sriwijaya – 2015–2016
 Ivan Bošnjak – Persija Jakarta – 2014
 Marko Šimić – Persija Jakarta – 2018–2022
 Mijo Dadić – Persiba Balikpapan, Deltras – 2008–2012
 Tomislav Labudović – Persiba Balikpapan – 2012–2013

Cyprus 
 Alekos Alekou – Barito Putera – 2015

Czech Republic 
 Michael Krmenčík – Persija Jakarta – 2022–
 Ondřej Kúdela – Persija Jakarta – 2022–

East Timor 
 Alan Leandro – Sriwijaya, Mitra Kukar – 2012, 2016
 Diogo Santos Rangel – Sriwijaya, Gresik United – 2012–2013
 Felipe Bertoldo – Mitra Kukar, Arema – 2016, 2017
 Jesse Pinto – Mitra Kukar – 2013–2014
 Paulo Helber – Bhayangkara Surabaya United – 2016–2017
 Paulo Martins – PSM Makassar – 2016
 Pedro Henrique – Madura United, Persikabo 1973 – 2022–
 Thiago Fernandes – Persipura Jayapura – 2016

England 
 Adam Mitter – Persiraja Banda Aceh, Persita Tangerang, PSM Makassar – 2020, 2021–2022
 Carlton Cole – Persib Bandung – 2017
 Daniel Heffernan – Bali United – 2016–2017
 Danny Guthrie – Mitra Kukar – 2018
 Marcus Bent – Mitra Kukar – 2011–2012

Estonia 
 Martin Vunk – Persija Jakarta – 2015

Finland 
 Eero Markkanen – PSM Makassar – 2019
 Petteri Pennanen – Persikabo 1973 – 2020

France 
 Loris Arnaud – Persela Lamongan, TIRA-Persikabo – 2018–2019
 Steven Paulle – PSM Makassar, Persija Jakarta – 2017–2019

Germany 
 Romeo Filipović – Bontang, Persela Lamongan – 2010, 2016–2017
 Hanno Behrens – Persija Jakarta – 2022–

Ghana 
 Emmanuel Oti Essigba – Madura United – 2020
 Michael Essien – Persib Bandung – 2016–2017

Greece 
 Alexandros Tanidis – PSMS Medan – 2018–2019

Guam 
 Shane Malcolm – PSM Makassar, Bhayangkara Surabaya United, Persela Lamongan – 2016

Guinea 
 Aboubacar Camara – PS TNI – 2017
 Aboubacar Sylla – PS TNI – 2017

Guinea Bissau 
 Abel Camará – Arema – 2022–
 Amido Baldé – Persebaya Surabaya, PSM Makassar – 2019

Hong Kong 
 Lam Hok Hei – Persija Jakarta – 2013
 Sandro – PSM Makassar – 2018

Iran 
 Ebrahim Loveinian – Persisam Putra Samarinda – 2013–2014
 Javad Moradi – Persidafon Dafonsoro, Persita Tangerang – 2012–2014
 Milad Zeneyedpour – Madura United – 2018

Iraq 
 Anmar Almubaraki – Persiba Balikpapan 2017
 Brian Ferreira – PSS Sleman, Persela Lamongan, PSIS Semarang, Persiraja Banda Aceh 2019–2022
 Brwa Nouri – Bali United – 2018–
 Selwan Al-Jaberi – Persela Lamongan – 2022

Italy 
 Marco Motta – Persija Jakarta – 2020–2022

Ivory Coast 
 Boman Bi Irie Aimé – PSM Makassar, Perseru Serui – 2014–2018
 Boubacar Sanogo – Madura United – 2017
 Didier Zokora – Semen Padang – 2017
 Franck Bezi – Persiba Balikpapan, Persik Kediri – 2013–2014
 Hervé Guy – Bhayangkara – 2020
 Lamine Diarrassouba – PSM Makassar – 2016
 Lanciné Koné – Deltras, Persisam Putra Samarinda, Sriwijaya, Persipura Jayapura, Arema Cronus – 2011–2016
 Siaka Dembélé – Perseru Serui – 2016
 Wilfried Kisito Yessoh – PSMS Medan – 2018

Jamaica 
 Chevaughn Walsh – PSIS Semarang – 2022

Japan 
 Atsushi Yonezawa – Persiba Bantul – 2014
 Katsuyoshi Kimishima – Bhayangkara – 2022
 Kei Hirose – Persela Lamongan, Borneo – 2019–2020, 2021–
 Kenji Adachihara – Bontang, Persiba Balikpapan, Persib Bandung, Persita Tangerang – 2009–2014
 Kenzo Nambu – PSM Makassar – 2022–
 Kodai Iida – RANS Nusantara – 2022–
 Kosuke Uchida – Persela Lamongan, Barito Putera – 2017, 2019
 Masahito Noto – Persiba Balikpapan – 2017
 Mitsuru Maruoka – RANS Nusantara – 2022
 Renshi Yamaguchi – Arema – 2021–
 Ryo Fujii – PSIS Semarang – 2023–
 Ryo Matsumura – Persis Solo – 2022–
 Ryota Noma – Barito Putera – 2022–
 Ryutaro Karube – Perseru Serui – 2017–2018
 Seiji Kaneko – Mitra Kukar – 2012
 Sho Yamamoto – Persebaya Surabaya – 2022–
 Shohei Matsunaga – Persib Bandung, Persiba Balikpapan, Gresik United, Persela Lamongan, PSMS Medan, PSIS Semarang – 2011–2019
 Shori Murata – Persiraja Banda Aceh – 2021
 Shunsuke Nakamura – Persela Lamongan – 2020
 Taisei Marukawa – Persebaya Surabaya, PSIS Semarang – 2021–
 Takafumi Akahoshi – Arema – 2019
 Takuya Matsunaga – Kalteng Putra, Persipura Jayapura – 2019–2022
 Tomoki Wada – Persikabo 1973 – 2022
 Tomoyuki Sakai – Pelita Jaya, Persiwa Wamena, Persiram Raja Ampat – 2010–2012
 Yamashita Kunihiro – Borneo, Perseru Serui/Badak Lampung – 2017–2019
 Yuichi Shibakoya - Pelita Jaya, Persiwa Wamena – 2010–2012
 Yusuke Kato – Gresik United – 2017

Kyrgyzstan 
 Akhlidin Israilov – PSIS Semarang – 2018
 Azamat Baimatov – Borneo, Barito Putera – 2018, 2021
 Bektur Talgat Uulu – PSM Makassar – 2021
 Tamirlan Kozubaev – Persita Tangerang – 2020–2021
 Veniamin Shumeyko – Persikabo 1973 – 2021–2022

Latvia 
 Deniss Romanovs – Pelita Bandung Raya – 2014–2015

Lebanon 
 Abou Bakr Al-Mel – PSIS Semarang – 2018
 Hussein El Dor – PSM Makassar – 2020
 Ibrahim Bahsoun – Persik Kediri – 2021
 Jad Noureddine – Pusamania Borneo, Arema – 2016–2017
 Jihad Ayoub – PSS Sleman – 2022–
 Mahmoud El Ali – Persiba Balikpapan – 2013
 Majed Osman – Dewa United – 2022–
 Mostafa El Qasaa – Persiba Balikpapan – 2013
 Omar El Din – Perseru Serui – 2017
 Samir Ayass – Persiraja Banda Aceh – 2020

Liberia 
 Alexander Robinson – Persela Lamongan, Persiba Balikpapan – 2008–2009, 2013
 Ansu Toure – Persiba Balikpapan – 2014–2015
 Boakay Eddie Foday – Persiwa Wamena, Sriwijaya, Persipura Jayapura – 2008–2015, 2016–2018
 Dirkir Kohn Glay – Persiba Balikpapan – 2016–2017
 Edward Junior Wilson – Semen Padang, Persipura Jayapura – 2008–2014, 2016
 Erick Weeks Lewis – Persiwa Wamena, Sriwijaya, Mitra Kukar, Pusamania Borneo, Madura United, Persib Bandung – 2008–2013, 2014–2016, 2016–2017
 Isaac Pupo – Persebaya ISL – 2014
 James Debbah - PKT Bontang, Persiram Raja Ampat - 2008-2010
 James Koko Lomell – Pelita Jaya, Gresik united, Deltras, Persija Jakarta, Barito Putera, Persiram Raja Ampat, Persipura Jayapura – 2008–2009, 2011–2016
 Jerry Boima Karpeh - Persisam Putra Samarinda, Persiram Raja Ampat - 2011-2013
 John Tarkpor Sonkaliey – Persitara Jakarta Utara, Persebaya Surabaya, Pelita Jaya, Persijap Jepara – 2008–2010, 2011–2012, 2014
 Josiah Seton – PKT Bontang – 2008–2009
 Kubay Quaiyan – Persiram Raja Ampat – 2011–2014
 Sengbah Kennedy – Arema, Persipura Jayapura – 2015–2016
 Yao Rudy Abblode – Arema – 2015
 Zah Rahan Krangar – Sriwijaya, Persipura Jayapura, Madura United, PSS Sleman, Persela Lamongan 2008–2014, 2018–2021

Malaysia 
 Kiko Insa – Arema, Bali United – 2015–2016
 Safee Sali – Pelita Jaya – 2010–2013

Mali 
 Abdoulaye Maïga – Sriwijaya, Persipura Jayapura – 2013–2015, 2018
 Amadou Gakou – Perseru Serui – 2016
 Djibril Coulibaly – Barito Putera, Persib Bandung, Persija Jakarta 2013–2014, 2016
 Dramane Coulibaly – Pelita Jaya – 2010–2011
 Mahamadou N'Diaye – Sriwijaya, Bali United – 2017–2019
 Makan Konaté – PSPS Pekanbaru, Barito Putera, Persib Bandung, Sriwijaya, Arema, Persebaya Surabaya, Persija Jakarta. RANS Nusantara – 2012–2015, 2018–2020, 2022–
 Mamadou Samassa – Madura United, Persipura Jayapura – 2018–2019
 Mohamed Sissoko – Mitra Kukar – 2017
 Sékou Camara – PSAP Sigli, Persiwa Wamena, Pelita Bandung Raya – 2011–2013

Martinique 
 Julien Faubert – Borneo – 2018

Moldova 
 Eduard Văluță – Persepam MU – 2014

Montenegro 
 Balša Božović – Persela Lamongan, Arema – 2015, 2018
 Danin Talović – Persikabo 1973 – 2021–2022
 Igor Radusinović – Barito Putera – 2015
 Miljan Radović – Persib Bandung, Pelita Bandung Raya – 2011–2013
 Miloš Krkotić – Bali United – 2018
 Srđan Lopičić – Persisam Putra Samarinda, Persela Lamongan, Borneo, Arema, Persiba Balikpapan, Persib Bandung – 2011–2012, 2014–2016, 2017–2019
 Vladimir Vujović – Persib Bandung, Bhayangkara – 2014–2018
 Zdravko Dragićević – Persib Bandung – 2011

Morocco 
 Khairallah Abdelkbir – Bhayangkara – 2016
 Redouane Barkaoui – Persiwa Wamena, Pelita Jaya, Persela Lamongan – 2009–2013
 Redouane Zerzouri – Madura United, PS TNI – 2017
 Youness Mokhtar – Bhayangkara – 2022

Namibia 
 Sadney Urikhob – PSMS Medan – 2018

Nepal 
 Rohit Chand – PSPS Pekanbaru, Persija Jakarta, Persik Kediri – 2012–2015, 2017–

Netherlands 
 Anco Jansen – PSM Makassar – 2021–2022
 Arsenio Valpoort – Persebaya Surabaya – 2022
 Djamel Leeflang – Perseru Serui – 2018
 Emile Linkers – Persepam MU – 2013–14
 Geoffrey Castillion – Persib Bandung – 2020–2021
 Jan Lammers – Borneo – 2019
 Kevin Brands – Bali United – 2018
 Kevin van Kippersluis – Persib Bandung – 2019
 Kristian Adelmund – Persepam Madura United, Persela Lamongan – 2012–2013, 2015–2016
 Melvin Platje – Bali United, Bhayangkara – 2018–2022
 Nick Kuipers – Persib Bandung – 2019–
 Nick van der Velden – Bali United – 2017–2018
 Ronald Hikspoors – PSM Makassar – 2016
 Sylvano Comvalius – Bali United, Arema, Persipura Jayapura – 2017, 2019–2020
 Wiljan Pluim – PSM Makassar – 2016–

New Zealand 
 Shane Smeltz – Borneo – 2017

Nigeria 
 Anoure Obiora – Sriwijaya, PSM Makassar, Persisam Putra Samarinda – 2008—2010, 2013
 Ernest Jeremiah - Persipura Jayapura – 2008–2009
 George Oyedepo – Persiba Bantul – 2014
 Kabir Bello - Persitara Jakarta Utara, PSPS Pekanbaru - 2008-2011, 2012-2015
 Onyekachukwu Aloso – Persidafon Dafonsoro – 2013
 Peter Odemwingie – Madura United – 2017–2018
 Udo Fortune – Persik Kediri – 2014

North Macedonia 
 Aleksandar Bajevski – Pelita Jaya – 2011–2012
 Goran Gančev – PSMS Medan, Semen Padang, Pusamania Borneo, Arema, Persegres Gresik, Sriwijaya 2012, 2015–2017, 2018
 Jasmin Mecinovikj - Persela Lamongan – 2020
 Risto Mitrevski – Dewa United – 2022–

Palestine 
 Jonathan Cantillana – PSIS Semarang, PSS Sleman – 2019–
 Mahmoud Eid – Persebaya Surabaya – 2020
 Mohammed Rashid – Persib Bandung – 2021–2022
 Yashir Islame – Barito Putera – 2020

Paraguay 
 Aldo Barreto – PSM Makassar, Bontang, Persiba Balikpapan, Gresik United – 2008–2014
 Arnaldo Villalba – Persijap Jepara – 2008–2010
 Carlos González – Persiba Balikpapan – 2014
 Diego Fretes – Persepam MU – 2014
 Jorge Bareiro – Gresik United – 2010–2011
 José Jara – Persepam MU – 2014
 Juan Acuña – Barito Putera – 2014–2015
 Juan Ramirez – Pelita Jaya – 2010–2011
 Julio Larrea – Persebaya ISL – 2014
 Lorenzo Cabanas - Persija Jakarta, Persiba Balikpapan, Persib Bandung - 2005-2009
 Pedro Javier – Persija Jakarta, Gresik United, Persela Lamongan, Borneo 2011–2016
 Richard Caceres – Persija Jakarta, Persiba Balikpapan – 2009–2010, 2011–2012
 Roberto Acosta – Deltras, PSM Makassar
 Samuel Lim Núñez – Persidafon Dafonsoro – 2013
 Wilfredo Genes - PSIM Yogyakarta, Bontang FC - 2007-2009

Philippines 
 Daisuke Sato – Persib Bandung – 2022–
 Jason de Jong – Persiba Balikpapan – 2011
 Marwin Angeles – Persik Kediri – 2022 
 Mike Ott – Barito Putera – 2022–
 Omid Nazari – Persib Bandung – 2019–2021
 Satoshi Ōtomo – Persib Bandung, Bontang, Persela Lamongan – 2010–2012

Portugal 
 Carlos Fortes – Arema, PSIS Semarang – 2021–
 Elio Bruno Martins – PS TIRA, Bhayangkara – 2017–2018
 Flávio Silva – Persik Kediri – 2023–
 José Coelho – Persela Lamongan – 2017–2018
 Paulo Sérgio – Bhayangkara, Bali United – 2017–2020
 Sérgio Silva – Arema – 2021–
 Zé Valente – PSS Sleman, Persebaya Surabaya – 2022–

Republic of Ireland 
 Roy O'Donovan – Mitra Kukar – 2015

Russia 
 Evgeni Kabaev – Persija Jakarta – 2015

Saint Kitts and Nevis 
 Keith Kayamba Gumbs – Sriwijaya, Arema Cronus – 2008–2013

Saudi Arabia 
 Fahad Al-Dossari – Persiram Raja Ampat – 2013–2014

Scotland 
 Chris Doig – Pelita Jaya – 2011

Senegal 
 Pape N'Daw – Persipura Jayapura – 2018
 Pape N'Diaye – PSPS Pekanbaru, Persidafon Dafonsoro, Gresik United, Persiba Balikpapan – 2012–2014

Serbia 
 Aleksandar Rakić – PS TIRA/Persikabo 1973, Madura United, Barito Putera – 2018–2022
 Boban Nikolić – Pelita Bandung Raya – 2014–2015
 Bojan Mališić – Persib Bandung, Badak Lampung – 2018–2020
 Danilo Sekulić – Barito Putera – 2020
 Mario Maslać – PSS Sleman – 2021–22
 Nemanja Kojić – PSS Sleman – 2021
 Nemanja Obrić - Mitra Kukar, Pelita Bandung Raya - 2011-2013
 Nemanja Vidaković – Bali United – 2016
 Nemanja Vučićević – PSM Makassar – 2015
 Nikola Ašćerić – Persik Kediri – 2020
 Nikola Komazec – Bhayangkara – 2018
 Petar Planić – PSIS Semarang – 2018
 Saša Zečević – Persiwa Wamena, PSMS Medan, Gresik United – 2010–2013, 2014–2017
 Srđan Ostojić – Arema – 2018
 Vanja Marković – Persiraja Banda Aceh – 2021
 Zoran Knežević – Bali United – 2016

Sierra Leone 
 Abu Bakar Bah - PSAP Sigli – 2011–2012
 Alie Sesay – Persebaya Surabaya, PSIS Semarang – 2021–22
 Brima Pepito – Persiba Balikpapan, Persema Malang, Persitara North Jakarta – 2008–2012
 Ibrahim Conteh – Pelita Bandung Raya, Barito Putera, PS TNI, PSIS Semarang, Persipura Jayapura – 2015–2019

Singapore 
 Agu Casmir – Persija Jakarta – 2010–2011
 Baihakki Khaizan – Persija Jakarta, Persib Bandung – 2009–2011
 Fahrudin Mustafić – Persija Jakarta, Persela Lamongan 2009–2011
 Itimi Dickson – Persitara North Jakarta, Persidafon Dafonsoro 2007–2009, 2011–2012
 Khairul Amri – Persiba Balikpapan – 2010–2011
 Muhammad Ridhuan – Arema Indonesia, Putra Samarinda, Borneo – 2009–2014, 2018
 Noh Alam Shah – Arema Indonesia, Persib Bandung – 2009–2012
 Precious Emuejeraye – Sriwijaya, Persija Jakarta, Persiba Balikpapan, Persidafon Dafonsoro – 2009–2013

Spain 
 Alfonso de la Cruz – PSS Sleman – 2019–2020
 Fernando Rodríguez – Mitra Kukar, Persis Solo – 2018, 2022–
 Gerard Artigas – Persis Solo – 2022
 Joan Tomàs Campasol – Persija Jakarta – 2019
 Jorge Gotor Blas – Mitra Kukar – 2017
 José Galán – Persela Lamongan – 2016
 Juan Carlos Belencoso – Persib Bandung – 2015–2016
 Pablo Rodríguez Aracil – Madura United – 2016
 Victor Herrero – Mitra Kukar – 2016–2017
 Youssef Ezzejjari – Persik Kediri, Bhayangkara – 2021–22

Slovakia 
 Roman Chmelo – Arema Indonesia, PSM Makassar – 2009–2012, 2014
 Roman Golian – Arema Indonesia, Persela Lamongan, Persiba Balikpapan – 2011–2016

Slovenia 
 Nastja Ceh – PSMS Medan – 2012–2013
 Rene Mihelič – Persib Bandung – 2019

South Africa 
 Mfundo Cecil – PSAP Sigli – 2011–12
 Sthembiso Ntombela – PSAP Sigli – 2011

South Korea 
 Ahn Byung-keon – Bali United – 2016–2018
 An Hyo-yeon – Persela Lamongan – 2010–2011
 Bae Sin-yeong – Persita Tangerang – 2021–
 Choi Dong-soo – Persisam Putra Samarinda, PSMS Medan, Persipura Jayapura – 2010–2013
 Choi Hyun-yeon – Persegres Gresik United – 2017
 Ha Dae-won – Barito Putera, Bali United – 2013–2015
 Han Dong-won – Persijap Jepara – 2014
 Han Sang-min – Persela Lamongan – 2013
 Hong Jeong-nam – Madura United – 2022
 Hong Soon-hak – Persija Jakarta, PS TNI – 2016–2017
 Jeon Sung-ha – Persiram Raja Ampat,, PSAP Sigli – 2011–2012
 Jeon Woo-young – PS TIRA – 2018
 Jeong Kwang-sik – Persija Jakarta, Madura United – 2012, 2016
 Joo Ki-hwan - PSM Makassar, PSPS Pekanbaru - 2010, 2012
 Kim Dong-chan – Persisam Putra Samarinda, Persiwa Wamena – 2012–2013
 Kim Jin-Sung – Madura United, Barito Putera – 2021-2022
 Kim Kang-hyun - Persibo Bojonegoro, Persita Tangerang, Persiwa Wamena - 2010-2012
 Kim Sang-min – PS TIRA – 2018
 Kim Yong-hee – Persiba Balikpapan, Sriwijaya, Arema Indonesia – 2010–2013
 Kim Young-kwang – Persiba Balikpapan – 2013–2014
 Ko Jae-hyo – PSPS Pekanbaru – 2012
 Ko Jae-sung – Semen Padang – 2017
 Kwon Jun – PSM Makassar, Persepam MU – 2010–2012, 2013, 2016–2017
 Lee Dong-won – Sriwijaya – 2013
 Lee Kil-Hoon – Semen Padang – 2016
 Lee Sang-min – Mitra Kukar – 2011
 Lee Soung-yong – PSAP Sigli, Persiram Raja Ampat – 2011–2013
 Lee Won-Jae – Bhayangkara – 2020–2021
 Lim Joon-sik – Sriwijaya, Persipura Jayapura, Barito Putera – 2010–2016
 Na Byung-yul – Persik Kediri, Persita Tangerang – 2009–2010, 2013
 Oh In-Kyun – PSMS Medan, Persela Lamongan, Gresik United, Mitra Kukar, Persib Bandung, Persipura Jayapura, Arema – 2011–2020
 Park Chan-young – Deltras – 2010–2011
 Park Chul-hyung – Persema Malang, Semen Padang, PSPS Pekanbaru, Persela Lamongan, Gresik United, Mitra Kukar – 2009–2015
 Park Jung-hwan – Persiba Balikpapan, PSM Makassar, Sriwijaya – 2009–2012
 Park Kyung-min – Persija Jakarta, Pelita Bandung Raya – 2012–2013
 Shin Hyun-joon – PSM Makassar, PSPS Pekanbaru, Deltras, PSMS Medan – 2009–2013
 Yoo Jae-Hoon – Persipura Jayapura, Bali United, Mitra Kukar, Barito Putera – 2010–2019
 Yoo Wook-jin – PSAP Sigli, Persiram Raja Ampat – 2011–2012

Switzerland 
 Karim Rossi – Dewa United – 2022

Syria 
 Marwan Sayedeh – Pelita Jaya, PSM Makassar, Gresik United, Pelita Bandung Raya – 2009–2014
 Naser Al Sebai – Persib Bandung, Persisam Putra Samarinda – 2013, 2014

Tajikistan 
 Khurshed Beknazarov – TIRA-Persikabo – 2019
 Manuchekhr Dzhalilov – Sriwijaya, Persebaya Surabaya – 2018–2019
 Nuriddin Davronov – Madura United, Borneo, Persita Tangerang – 2018, 2020–2022

Thailand 
 Sinthaweechai Hathairattanakool – Persib Bandung – 2009
 Suchao Nuchnum – Persib Bandung – 2009–2010

Togo 
 Ali Khaddafi – PSM Makassar, Bontang, PSPS Pekanbaru, Sriwijaya, Persepam MU, Perseru Serui – 2008–2015
 Djaledjete Bedalbe – Perseru Serui – 2015
 Mawouna Amevor – Persela Lamongan – 2019

Trinidad and Tobago 
 Radanfah Abu Bakr – PS TNI – 2018

Tunisia 
 Tijani Belaïd – Sriwijaya, Borneo – 2017, 2018

Turkmenistan 
 Ahmet Ataýew – Arema, Persela – 2017–2018
 Artur Geworkýan – Persib Bandung – 2019
 Ata Geldiýew – Perseru Serui – 2018
 Mekan Nasyrow – Persik Kediri, Barito Putera, Semen Padang – 2009–2010, 2013, 2014, 2016–2017

Ukraine 
 Yevhen Bokhashvili – PSS Sleman, Persipura Jayapura 2019–21, 2021–22, 2023–
 Yevhen Budnik – Persita Tangerang – 2020

Uruguay 
 Esteban Guillén – PSMS Medan, Arema Indonesia, Persiba Balikpapan – 2008–2013
 Juan Alsina – Borneo – 2019
 Matías Malvino – Arema – 2020
 Matías Mier – Bhayangkara – 2023
 Ronald Fagundez – Persik Kediri, Persisam Putra Samarinda – 2008–2012

Uzbekistan 
 Artyom Filiposyan – TIRA-Persikabo – 2020
 Dilshod Sharofetdinov – PSMS Medan – 2018
 Javlon Guseynov – Borneo, Persita Tangerang''' – 2019–
 Pavel Purishkin – PSM Makassar – 2017
 Pavel Smolyachenko – Arema – 2019
 Pavel Solomin – Sriwijaya, Putra Samarinda – 2010–11, 2014
 Shukurali Pulatov – Semen Padang – 2019
 Jahongir Abdumominov – Persija Jakarta – 2019

Notes

References

External links
 

Liga 1 (Indonesia)
Liga 1 (Indonesia) players
all
Association football in Indonesia lists
Association football player non-biographical articles
Expatriate footballers in Indonesia
Indonesia